Maharao Shardul Singh ji Shekhawat was born in 1681 and was the ruler of Jhunjhunu (in present-day Rajasthan, India). After his death the estate was divided equally among his five sons, whose descendants continued to rule over it until India achieved independence.

To commemorate the memory of their father, his sons made a monumental dome with a fresco at Parasrampura. All five sons were very brave, capable, and efficient rulers. They raised many new villages, towns, forts and palaces, encouraged the Seths (merchants) for trade. As a result, they grew rich and made many havelies. The fresco-paintings of these havelies speak about that period and prosperity. Moreover, the rich merchants made the wells, ponds, bawries(step well), temples and inns at various places. They are the examples of industrial architectural excellence. The fresco-painting probably came into existence in the 18th century. It was during the period of Shardual Singh ji that fresco painting was in much vogue.

Personal life
He had three marriages. His first marriage was in 1698 to Thukrani Sahaj Kanwar Biki Ji Sahiba, the daughter of Manroop Singh Bika of Nathasar. His second marriage was to Thukrani Sirey Kanwar Biki Ji Sahiba, the daughter of Mukal Singh Bika of Nathasar. The third marriage was to Thukrani Bakhat Kanwar Mertani Ji Sahiba, the daughter of Devi Singh Mertiya of Poonglota (Marwar), near Degana and had children.

Children
He had six sons:
 Thakur Zorawar Singh, (by 1st wife), born at Kant, married and had children. He died in 1745. He built Jorawargarh fort, ancestor of the families of Chowkari, Taen, Kalipahari, Malsisar, Gangiyasar, Mandrella etc.
 Thakur Kishan Singh, (by 3rd wife), born in 1709, ancestor of the families of Khetri, Heerwa, Arooka, Seegra, Alsisar, etc.
 Kunwar Bahadur Singh, (by 3rd wife), born in 1712 and died in 1732.
 Thakur Akhay Singh, (by 3rd wife), born 1713, built Akhegarh Fort. Died without children in 1750.
 Thakur Nawal Singh Bahadur (by 3rd wife), born in 1715, ancestor of the families of Nawalgarh, Mahensar, Dorasar, Mukundgarh, Narsinghani, Baloda (pilani) and Mandawa. He died on 24 February 1780.
 Thakur Keshri Singh, (by 3rd wife), born in 1728, ancestor of the families of Dundlod, Surajgarh, and Bissau.  He was the 6th and youngest son and he died in 1768.

Death
Shardul Singh died on 25 April 1742.  His son Bahadur Singh had died in his lifetime at an early age. As a result, his estate was divided into five equal shares. The administration by his five sons was cumulatively known as Panchpana.

Year of birth missing
1742 deaths
History of Rajasthan
People from Jhunjhunu district